Panhala is an Indian Marathi language film directed by Nagesh Bhosle and produced by Nagesh Bhosle and Leena Deshmukh. The film starring Nagesh Bhosle, Sangram Salvi, Samidha Guru, Amruta Sant and Makrand Deshpande. Music by Anand Lukand. The film was released on 24 July 2015.

Synopsis 
The lives of two married couples, who come to Panhala, change after an unfortunate accident occurs where history repeats itself.

Cast 
 Nagesh Bhosle as Balkrishna 
 Sangram Salvi as swastik 
 Samidha Guru as Sneha
 Amruta Sant as Madhavi 
 Makrand Deshpande as Ajay

Soundtrack

Critical response
Panhala film received negative reviews from critics. Mihir Bhanage of The Times of India gave the film 2 stars out of 5 and wrote "The landscapes of Panhala have been captured well but that apart, the film disappoints". Ganesh Matkari of Pune Mirror wrote " While it would work in a play where the action is restricted by the stage space, in the open universe of cinema it feels odd. It’s a minor obstacle when you look at the entire film, but considering how our audience craves for a neat and clean resolution it may just be a step in the wrong direction". Jaydeep Pathak of Maharashtra Times wrote "Even though 'Panhala' is somewhat right in content, it fails in presentation. The lack of a strong screenplay linking the context of contemporary reality with the history of Panhala is clearly visible here".

References

External links
 
 

2015 films
2010s Marathi-language films
Indian drama films